Ingquza Hill Local Municipality, previously known as Qaukeni, is an administrative area in the OR Tambo District of Eastern Cape in South Africa.

Main places
The 2001 census divided the municipality into the following main places:

Politics 

The municipal council consists of sixty-four members elected by mixed-member proportional representation. Thirty-two councillors are elected by first-past-the-post voting in thirty-two wards, while the remaining thirty-two are chosen from party lists so that the total number of party representatives is proportional to the number of votes received. In the election of 1 November 2021 the African National Congress (ANC) won a majority of forty-six seats on the council.
The following table shows the results of the election.

References

External links
 Official website

Local municipalities of the OR Tambo District Municipality